Tamilselvanum Thaniyar Anjalum is a 2016 Indian Tamil-language action thriller film directed by Premsai and produced by Gautham Vasudev Menon.
The film stars Jai and Yami Gautam, with Ashutosh Rana, Santhanam, VTV Ganesh, Prem, Nassar, Thambi Ramaiah, Satya Krishnan and Thalapathy Dinesh, among others, in supporting roles. The film, featuring film score and soundtrack composed by Karthik.

It was inspired from David Koepp's 2012 Hollywood film Premium Rush. It was also simultaneously shot in Telugu as Courier Boy Kalyan. However, The Telugu version was released in September 2015, after financial issues for the film were solved earlier than for the Tamil version. Production began in 2012, but delays meant that the film only had a theatrical release during 2016. The film was released on 5 August 2016 and received mixed reviews from critics.

Plot 
Tamilselvan is a college dropout, who does all small jobs, but becomes disinterested. Soon, Tamil moves to Chennai and stays at his uncle AC Shakthivel's house to land in a satisfying profession. His friend Nasar, a courier boy, asks him to deliver a packet at a Khadi shop, where he meets Kavya and falls in love with her, where he becomes a courier boy in order to visit Kavya everyday. 

Meanwhile, Arun is a high-profile doctor, who forms a team to smuggle stem cells from pregnant women and makes them to take a medicine, which induces abortion. However, a ward boy named Manikandan finds about the smuggling operation when he overhears a conversation between Arun and his colleague. Manikandan couriers all the details to a social activist Sathyamoorthy in Chennai. When Arun learns that that the package is to be transported, he kills Manikandan and manages to make it look like an accident, where he also attacks Sathyamoorthy, who survives and orders his henchmen to snatch the courier from the courier boy, who is actually Tamil. 

A chase ensues between Tamil and Arun's henchmen where Tamil manages to subdue Arun and kill him in a road accident, after learning about his plan. Tamil provides the courier to Sathyamoorthy where the stem cell scam gets exposed and Arun's partners are arrested. After this, Tamil receives  reward for his bravery, where he gives the money to Manikandan's family and moves with Kavya on a date.

Cast 

 Jai as Tamilselvan
 Yami Gautam as Kavya
 Santhanam as Nasar
 Ashutosh Rana as Arun
 Nassar as Sathyamoorthy
 Thambi Ramaiah as Manikandan
 VTV Ganesh as AC Shakthivel
 Prem as Shiva
 Satya Krishnan as Shakthivel's wife
 Thalapathy Dinesh as Venu
 Madhan Bob as Office Manager
 Lollu Sabha Manohar as Kathiresan
 Swaminathan as "Rotten tooth" Sekar
 Shuhaib Jawahir as Don
Pasi Sathya as Mary
 Lollu Sabha Anthony
 Lollu Sabha Esther
 Bava Lakshmanan as Watchman
 Uma
 Azhagu
 Sampath Ram
 Pondy Ravi
 Gokul
 Magi
 Visweswara Rao
 Sangeetha Balan
 Vinitha
 Julie

Production 
Following the success of Engaeyum Eppothum (2011), Gautham Vasudev Menon entered negotiations and signed on Jai to act in a film he was producing, which would mark the directorial debut of Prem Sai, an erstwhile assistant to Prabhu Deva. In January 2012, Abhinaya was signed on to play the leading female role of a garments sales girl, while Santhanam and VTV Ganesh were also thereafter selected to portray supporting roles. In May 2012, Gautham Menon announced that the film would be simultaneously made in Telugu as Courier Boy Kalyan with Nithiin in the lead role. He also revealed that Karthik would compose the film's music, Om Prakash would handle the cinematography, and Rajeevan would be the project's art director. During the same month, Richa Gangopadhyay replaced Abhinaya as the lead actress in both versions of the film. Prior to beginning of the project, Menon revealed that if the film became a success, potential sequels under the titles of Tamilselvanum Varuvaithuraiyum and Tamilselvanum Podhupanithuraiyum  were planned. The film began production in June 2012, but Richa Gangopadhyay soon left the film after deciding to quit her career as an actress. After further discussions with actresses including Pooja Hegde, Yami Gautam was signed on to appear in both versions of the project during November 2012.

The film languished in development hell, owing to a lack of production funds from Gautham Menon and took several years to complete filming. Schedules were also delayed as a result of shooting the film twice in Tamil and then Telugu, with the timetabling of dates of artistes and technicians becoming a problem. In August 2015, Menon revealed that the film was ready for release and began promotions for the project, before only releasing Courier Boy Kalyan in the Telugu language. In July 2016, promotions restarted, signalling that the film would release soon after.

Soundtrack 

The audio was released on 8 September 2015. Singer Karthik composed the album. The lyrics were written by Madhan Karky, Na. Muthukumar & Viveka. The soundtrack consists of 3 songs

References

External links 
 

2016 films
2010s Tamil-language films
Indian multilingual films
Indian action thriller films
Films about organ trafficking
2016 action thriller films
2016 multilingual films